Potudan is a rural locality (a selo) and the administrative center of Potudanskoye Rural Settlement, Starooskolsky District, Belgorod Oblast, Russia. The population was 493 as of 2010. There are 11 streets.

Geography 
Potudan is located 36 km east of Stary Oskol (the district's administrative centre) by road. Logvinovka is the nearest rural locality.

References 

Rural localities in Starooskolsky District